The International Pharmacopoeia (Pharmacopoeia Internationalis, Ph. Int.) is a pharmacopoeia issued by the World Health Organization as a recommendation, with the aim to provide international quality specifications for pharmaceutical substances (active ingredients and excipients) and dosage forms, together with supporting general methods of analysis, for global use. Its texts can be used or adapted by any WHO member state wishing to establish legal pharmaceutical requirements.

The Ph.Int. is based primarily on medicines included in the current WHO Model List of Essential Medicines (EML) and medicines included in the current invitations to manufacturers to submit an expression of interest (EOI) to the WHO Prequalification Team – Medicines (PQT) and those of interest to other UN Organizations. In recent years, priority has been given to medicines of importance in low and middle income countries, which may not appear in any other pharmacopoeias, including child-friendly dosage forms.

The Ph.Int. is designed to serve all Member States, especially their national and regional regulatory authorities, organizations in the United Nations system, and regional and interregional harmonization efforts, and they underpin important public health initiatives, including the prequalification and procurement of quality medicines through major international entities, such as the Global Fund to Fight AIDS, Tuberculosis and Malaria, and UNICEF.

The monographs published in the Ph.Int. are established in an independent manner via a consultative procedure and based on international experience.
Monographs on radiopharmaceuticals developed with the International Atomic Energy Agency.

Editions

See also
 European Pharmacopoeia, another supranational pharmacopoeia

References

External links
 
 Procedure for the development of monographs and other texts for The International Pharmacopoeia. WHO Technical Report Series No. 992, 2015, Annex 1.
 The International Pharmacopoeia: revised concepts and future perspectives. WHO Technical Report Series, No. 908, 2003, Annex 2.
 Current projects: Monographs and general tests under review/revision for inclusion in the International Pharmacopoeia
 Radiopharmaceuticals
 Updating mechanism for the section on radiopharmaceuticals in The International Pharmacopoeia. WHO Technical Report Series, No. 992, 2015, Annex 2.
 Trade names of stationary phases found suitable in performing chromatographic tests described in The International Pharmacopoeia.
 Omitted Monographs
 WHO Expert Committee on Specifications for Pharmaceutical Preparations

Pharmacopoeias